Community School of Davidson (CSD) is a public charter school located in Davidson, North Carolina. Their mascot is the Spartans. The school was founded by Joy Warner, the current Executive Director, and opened in 2001 as Children's Community School and adopted its current name in 2009. The school's founding principles center around The Basic School, and research done by Dr. Ernest Boyer. The school operates an elementary school, middle school, and high school on two separate campuses. Grades kindergarten through 7th "loop" with their teachers for 2 years. With both campuses combined, the student body is approximately 1,300 pupils, with about 100 per grade level. Each year, the random lottery that selects new families to attend CSD leaves over 3,000 students on the wait list for entry.

When CSD originally started under the name Children's Community School in 2001, it was a secular private school out of Lake Norman Baptist Church in Huntersville, North Carolina. The school originally had only one kindergarten class, but it expanded by one grade over its first three years. In its fourth year, it became a charter school. With the school now having around 60 students, the directors decided that a new building was needed to accommodate the larger number of students, so they purchased the former Elox manufacturing facility in Davidson, NC. That building now houses the kindergarten through 7th grades, while the 8th through 12th grades reside about 1 mile up the road in a newer space. In the high school building, the 8th grade resides in a separate wing from the high school grades.

CSD is known for its inclusion exceptional children's program, integration of the arts and its commitment to service. Students are engaged in service beginning in kindergarten and expand their service with a service-learning program called Practicum in 8th grade where there are 6–8 students in each group.  They continue in high school by participating in service Fridays through the advisory program made up of small groups of 12–14 students per teacher.

The arts program at CSD is an integral part of the curriculum. Students are exposed to a variety of arts classes, and many high school students choose a concentration for their 4 years. The theater program is  notable for always having a show in rehearsal, performing 4 times yearly even through the summer months.

The sports program and boosters are currently raising funds to build a Sports Complex for outdoor sports teams. The high school teams have won multiple state championships including 2 in women's soccer, 4 in women's volleyball, and women's cross country. The school also has multiple state Wells Fargo Cup wins noting a culmination of points among all school sports.

References

External links
 

Public elementary schools in North Carolina
Public middle schools in North Carolina
Public high schools in North Carolina
Educational institutions established in 2001
Charter schools in North Carolina
Schools in Mecklenburg County, North Carolina
2001 establishments in North Carolina